Gatra or GATRA may refer to:
Gatra (magazine)
Gatra (music)
Greater Attleboro Taunton Regional Transit Authority

See also
Gotra, Indian lineage